From the Noble Savage to the Noble Revolutionary (Spanish: Del buen salvaje al buen revolucionario) is a book published in 1976 by Venezuelan writer Carlos Rangel that seeks to explore a new interpretation of the reality of Latin America far from and opposed to, what the author considers to be, myths spread and little questioned about the Latin American identity promoted mostly by the region's nationalists and socialists and that even has been exported as image to the rest of the world.

The book has had over sixteen editions in Spanish and has been translated into English, French, Italian, Portuguese and German. The prologue was written by French thinker Jean-François Revel. The epilogue, on the occasion of the book's thirtieth anniversary in 2006, was in written by the Cuban political analyst Carlos Alberto Montaner.

Summary

Objecting the myth of the noble savage 
The main myth that Rangel seeks to rebut is what he identifies as an adapted version of the myth of the noble savage and the Golden Age - Old World myths - in which Latin Americans would be good people but corrupted by the western society that has destroyed their original values and from which it will be necessary to liberate themselves through revolutions that separate Latin America from the West and reestablish a lost identity different from the Western one.

According to Rangel, this mythology would be the result of a compensatory process in the face of the historical failure of the Hispano-American nations in the face of the progress of the European and North American nations, which in some cases started from the same or worse conditions. Transforming a previous society into another requires time and the Meso and South American societies have the challenge of achieving it.

Rejection of Latin American victimism 
The author uses analysis in the field of history, psychology and philosophy in the book. Rangel does not deny that Latin America has suffered abuses throughout history; what he rejects is the nationalist victimism that transfers all blame for underdevelopment to other nations and the existence of a Latin American identity different from the West.

Criticism of the "noble revolutionary" 
For Rangel, the mistaken vision of Latin America as a victim of the developed world and the wealthy classes has forged a stock character, the "noble revolutionary", who promotes populism, protectionism, caudillismo and authoritarianism as a solution for the region "in revenge" for the abused received by Westerners and whose outbursts must be excused in the name of his "noble cause".

For the author, the revolution, populism and idolatry of the state of the Latin American "noble revolutionary" are nothing more than the continuation of the ills that already existed in pre-Columbian societies, the colony and the nineteenth-century republics; as such, said path would not correct but rather aggravate that heritage.

Defense of the West: Spanish America 
Carlos Rangel argues in favor of Western values hated by the "noble revolutionary" which, according to the book, are foolishly blamed for the ills of the Hispano-American nations. For the author, the solution to Latin America's stagnation - which Rangel prefers to call Spanish America - is the approachment to the West, of which it is part, through liberalism and its values favorable to individual sovereignty, equality before the law, private property, and freedom without conditions, and that this path would be the one that leads to prosperity as Western society demonstrates.

Reception 
To some critics, Rangel's book is the antithesis to the book Open Veins of Latin America published in 1971 by Eduardo Galeano, an icon of the Latin American left-wing.

The theoretical and ideological positions of the book caused great controversy at the time. In 1976, in the year of its publication, detractors of his ideas publicly burned copies of the book at the Central University of Venezuela.

See also 
 Guide to the Perfect Latin American Idiot

References

External links 
 Del buen salvaje al buen revolucionario - Google Docs 

1976 essays
Venezuelan literature
Books about liberalism
Essays about politics
Spanish essays